Aarne Penttinen (9 April 1918, Sortavalan maalaiskunta – 13 July 1981) was a Finnish politician. He served as a Member of the Parliament of Finland from 1970 to 1972, representing the Finnish Rural Party (SMP).

References

1918 births
1981 deaths
People from Sortavala
Finnish Rural Party politicians
Members of the Parliament of Finland (1970–72)